8th OTO Awards

SND, Bratislava, Slovakia

Overall winner  Petra Polnišová

Hall of Fame  Karol Machata

Život Awards  MafStory Téma dňa 

◄ 7th | 9th ►

The 8th OTO Awards, honoring the best in Slovak popular culture for the year 2007, took time and place on March 12, 2008, at the former Opera building of the Slovak National Theater in Bratislava. The ceremony broadcast live STV. The hosts of the show were Jan Kraus and Zuzana Fialová.

Performers
 Peter Cmorik, singer
 Peter Dvorský and Adriana Kučerová, opera singers
 Fragile, band
 Jozef Ráž and Ján Baláž 
 Štefan Skrúcaný, actor
 Helena Vondráčková, singer

Winners and nominees

Main categories
 Television

 Music

Others

Superlatives

Multiple winners
 2 awards
 Susedia – Markíza

Multiple nominees
 2 nominations
 Zlatica Švajdová (née Puškárová)
 Susedia – Markíza

Reception

TV ratings
The show has received a total audience of more than 709,000 viewers, making it the most watched television program within prime time in the region.

References

External links
 Archive > OTO 2007 – 8th edition  (Official website)
 OTO 2007 – 8th edition (Official website - old)
 Winners and nominees including the total number of votes (at Život.Azet.sk)
 Results including the first round - Top 7 list (at Topky.sk)

08
2007 in Slovak music
2007 in Slovak television
2007 television awards